The James Madison Dukes women's lacrosse team is an NCAA Division I college lacrosse team representing James Madison University as part of the American Athletic Conference. They play their home games at Sentara Park in Harrisonburg, Virginia. The Dukes have been led by Shelley Klaes-Bawcombe since 2007. In 2018, the Dukes won the National Championship, beating Boston College 16-15.

The Dukes had been conference members of the Colonial Athletic Association since the conference began sponsoring the sport in 1992. With JMU having moved most of its other sports to the Sun Belt Conference, which does not sponsor women's lacrosse, in July 2022, the Dukes joined the American Athletic Conference as an affiliate member at that time.

Individual career records

Reference:

Individual single-season records

SeasonsReference:

Postseason Results

The Dukes have appeared in 17 NCAA tournaments. Their postseason record is 13-16. They were National Champions in 2018.

References

Lacrosse, women
American Athletic Conference women's lacrosse
College women's lacrosse teams in the United States